The 1996–97 Slovenian Third League was the fifth season of the Slovenian Third League, the third highest level in the Slovenian football system.
Triglav Kranj merged with Naklo during the season.

League standings

East

West

See also
1996–97 Slovenian Second League

References

External links
Football Association of Slovenia 

Slovenian Third League seasons
3
Slovenia